First Indian Presbyterian Church is a historic Presbyterian church in Kamiah, Idaho. The church was constructed in 1871 on land belonging to Chief Lawyer, a member of the Nez Perce tribe. While the church was originally designed in the Greek Revival style, an 1890 renovation gave it a Gothic Revival design. Missionary Henry Spalding briefly lived in Kamiah in 1873 and worked with the members of the church during his time there. The church continues to worship weekly and uses the Nez Perce language in its hymns.

The church was added to the National Register of Historic Places in 1976.

References

Presbyterian churches in Idaho
Churches on the National Register of Historic Places in Idaho
Greek Revival architecture in Idaho
Carpenter Gothic church buildings in Idaho
Churches completed in 1874
Buildings and structures in Idaho County, Idaho
National Register of Historic Places in Idaho County, Idaho